Unpublished Story is a 1942 British black-and-white war film directed by Harold French and starring Richard Greene and Valerie Hobson. It was produced and co-written by Anthony Havelock-Allan.

The film served as a propaganda film during World War II. The film has two main plots. The first one involves a journalist whose stories are repeatedly censored by the Ministry of Information. The second one involves a pacifist organisation, whose members are actually agents of Nazi Germany.

Plot
In May 1940 Bob Randall (Greene), a war correspondent with a (fictional) London newspaper, the Gazette, is evacuated with British troops from the beaches of Dunkirk. He writes a hard-hitting story about his experiences, but it is censored by the Ministry of Information. Randall goes to see Lamb (Radford), the official responsible, but Lamb will not change his decision.

As London burns in the Blitz and the newspaper struggles to stay in business, Randall writes several more eyewitness articles, and then learns of People For Peace, a pacifist organisation. He suspects that its members are tools of the Nazis and investigates the group. He finds the Gazettes fashion journalist, Carole Bennett (Hobson), at the group's meeting, also there after a story. Later, following up the story at the group's offices, Randall is surprised to see Lamb there and obviously familiar with the leading members. Afterwards Lamb tells him that he is with British counter-intelligence and that Randall's suspicions are correct, but with the group under official investigation he must drop his coverage of the story.

Trapes, one of the group's members, changes his views after his own home is bombed and sends Bennett a statement denouncing the organisation, but, still suffering from shock, he naively informs his fellow "pacifists". Revealing themselves to be Nazi agents, they force him to contact Bennett in an attempt to retrieve the letter. However, at the rendezvous they are captured after a shoot-out with the authorities. The two reporters think they have a great story, but Lamb makes it clear that the incident must remain unpublished. The closing scene shows Randall and Bennett, now lovers, kissing and posed against the backdrop of war-damaged London.

Cast

 Richard Greene as Bob Randall
 Valerie Hobson as Carol Bennett
 Basil Radford as Lamb
 Roland Culver as Stannard
 Brefni O'Rorke as Denton
 Miles Malleson as Farmfield
 George Carney as Landlord
 Muriel George as Landlady
 André Morell as Marchand
 Frederick Cooper as Trapes
 George Thorpe as Major Edwards
 Renee Gadd as Miss Hartley
 Claude Bailey as George Roddington
 Ronald Shiner as Agitator
 Wally Patch as Taxi driver at Victoria Station
 Edie Martin as Mrs. Duncan (uncredited)

Critical reception
The Radio Times noted, "Richard Greene was seconded from the Army to star in this flag-waver, which bears a passing resemblance to Foreign Correspondent," and concluded that the film was "Diverting rather than involving, this is of primary interest nowadays for its splendid supporting cast."

References

External links
 
 
 

1940s war drama films
British black-and-white films
British war drama films
British spy films
British World War II propaganda films
1940s English-language films
Films about censorship
Films about journalists
Films directed by Harold French
Films produced by Anthony Havelock-Allan
Films set in 1940
Films set in London
Films with screenplays by Anatole de Grunwald
Films with screenplays by Patrick Kirwan
Two Cities Films films
1942 drama films
1942 films